Mansour Al-Mansour (Arabic:منصور المنصور) (1941 – November 9, 2011), was a Kuwaiti actor.

Works

Series TV 
Hababah (1976)
To My Father and Mother With The Greeting (1979)
To My Father and Mother With The Greeting 2 (1982)
Al Aseel (2007)

Death 
Al-Mansour was on business with the Gulf Arab Theater Group when he died of pneumonia in Algeria on November 9, 2011, after a severe cold wave.

References

1941 births
2011 deaths
Deaths from pneumonia in Algeria
Kuwaiti male actors
Kuwaiti male stage actors
Kuwaiti male film actors
20th-century Kuwaiti male actors
21st-century Kuwaiti male actors